Leong Chim Seong (born 1 November 1940) is a Malaysian weightlifter. He competed at the 1964 Summer Olympics and the 1968 Summer Olympics.

References

1940 births
Living people
Malaysian male weightlifters
Olympic weightlifters of Malaysia
Weightlifters at the 1964 Summer Olympics
Weightlifters at the 1968 Summer Olympics
Place of birth missing (living people)
20th-century Malaysian people